Arturo Andrés Norambuena Ardiles (born 22 November 1971), commonly known as Arturo Norambuena, is a retired Chilean footballer who played as forward and current manager.

He previously played in his homeland with Universidad Católica. Norambuena graduated in forestry in Universidad Austral de Chile. Norambuena has also been involved with Chile's national set-up.

Coaching career

Deportes Valdivia
On 27 August 2019, Norambuena was appointed manager of Deportes Valdivia. However, after a period with bad results, he was fired on 2 October 2019.

Honours

Club
Universidad Católica
 Primera División de Chile (1): 2002 Apertura

Cobreloa
 Primera División de Chile (1): 2003 Clausura

References

External links
 
 
 Arturo Norambuena at PlaymakerStats

1971 births
Living people
People from Valdivia
Chilean footballers
Chilean expatriate footballers
Chile international footballers
Deportes Iberia footballers
Santiago Morning footballers
Universidad de Concepción footballers
Audax Italiano footballers
Club Deportivo Universidad Católica footballers
Quilmes Atlético Club footballers
Cobreloa footballers
Puerto Rico Islanders players
Tercera División de Chile players
Primera B de Chile players
Chilean Primera División players
Argentine Primera División players
USL First Division players
Expatriate footballers in Argentina
Expatriate footballers in Puerto Rico
Chilean expatriate sportspeople in Argentina
Chilean expatriate sportspeople in Puerto Rico
Chilean expatriate sportspeople in the United States 
Association football forwards
Chilean football managers
Cobresal managers
Deportes Valdivia managers
Chilean Primera División managers
Primera B de Chile managers
Austral University of Chile alumni
Chilean foresters